Hermann III may refer to:

 Hermann III, Duke of Swabia (died 1012)
 Hermann III, Margrave of Baden (died 1160)
 Hermann III, Count of Weimar-Orlamünde (1230–1283)